The Three Ducal Ministers, also translated as the Three Dukes, Three Excellencies, or the Three Lords, was the collective name for the three highest officials in Ancient China and Imperial China. These posts were abolished by Cao Cao in 208 AD and replaced with the position of Grand Chancellor. When Cao Cao's son Cao Pi became King of Wei after his father's death, he reinstated the three positions. Hua Xin was made Chancellor, Jia Xu was made Grand Commandant and Wang Lang was made Grand Secretary. When Cao Pi declared himself emperor in late 220, Hua Xin was made Cao Wei's first Minister of the Masses, Jia Xu remained as Grand Commandant, and Wang Lang was made the first Minister of Works.

Overview 
Each minister was responsible for different areas of government, but the boundaries were often blurred. Together, the Three Ducal Ministers were the emperor's closest advisors. Toward the end of a dynasty, the positions were often sold to men of wealth to raise state revenue. 

Starting in the late Shang dynasty and Zhou dynasty, the top three were: 
 Grand Preceptor;
 Grand Tutor;
 Grand Protector.

During the Western Han dynasty, the three positions were:
  Chancellor
 Grand Secretary;
 Grand Commandant.

In the Eastern Han dynasty, the names of the Three Ducal Ministers were changed to: 
 Minister of War;
 Minister of the Masses;
 Minister of Works.
Because all three titles contain the word "司" (sī) at the time of the Eastern Han, the Three Ducal Ministers were also called "Sansī" (三司).

Rank 
During the Han dynasty, civil service officials were classified according to twenty grades (reduced to sixteen after 32 BC), expressed by the official's annual salary in terms of number of dàn (石) or Chinese bushels of grain. This ranged from the ten-thousand-bushel rank at the top to the one-hundred-bushel at the bottom. Under this system, the Three Ducal Ministers all held the highest rank of ten-thousand-bushel.

See also 
 Government of the Han dynasty
 Nine Ministers
 Translation of Han dynasty titles

Notes

References

Citations

Sources 

 
 

Gong (Duke)
Han dynasty politicians